KSIX (1230 AM) is a radio station broadcasting a local sports format featuring 2 local shows as well as Dan Patrick, Jim Rome and nights and weekends from SportsMap, with additional programming from Westwood One. Licensed to Corpus Christi, Texas owned by SPORTSRADIOCC, LLC.  The station is also simulcast on 95.1 FM and 96.1 FM in Corpus Christi.

Programming
KSIX has two local talk shows: The Halftime Report with Pudge and the weekly Quick 60 Racing Show.

KSIX Sales Manager Terry Shannon.

KSIX live sports programing includes the Houston Texans, the Houston Rockets,  and the Houston Astros.  KSIX is the only station in the Astros Radio Network to broadcast every season since the team came into the league as the Houston Colt .45s and is about to begin its 50th year as an affiliate.

In addition to the team broadcast rights, KSIX also carries Sunday and Monday and Thursday Night Football, the NFL on Westwood One, the NCAA Basketball Tourney, BCS bowls, and Westwood One College Football and basketball.

References

External links

SIX